Tiancheng Lou (born 1986) is a Chinese businessman who is the co-founder and chief technology officer of Pony.ai, an autonomous vehicle technology company. He is also a competitive programmer whose achievements include winning the Google Code Jam twice in 2008 and 2009, winning the TopCoder Open Marathon in 2015 and being a gold medalist at the 2004 International Olympiad in Informatics, coming third overall. In terms of prize money won in major competitions, Lou is currently the most successful competitive programmer from China.

In 2017, Lou was included in the Innovators Under 35 list by MIT Technology Review magazine. In 2022, Business Insider named him as one of the 35 under 35 rising stars of the autonomous-vehicle industry.

Early life and education 
Lou was born in 1986 in Jinan, Shandong province. When he was in sixth grade of primary school, he moved to Hangzhou, Zhejiang province due to his parents' work. Both of his parents worked at Zhejiang University where his father was in the School of Public Affairs while his mother was in the Department of Chemistry.

Lou attended Hangzhou No. 14 High School where he graduated in 2004. In 2004, Lou came third place overall in the 2004 International Olympiad in Informatics where he won a gold medal. Due to his performance, he received a recommendation to attend Tsinghua University at the department of Computer Science and Technology.

Lou graduated from Tsinghua University in 2008 with a bachelor's degree in Computer Science. After finishing his first degree, he joined the Institute for Theoretical Computer Science at Tsinghua University as a PHD candidate in 2008 and earned his PhD in 2012. Lou was part of the university team in the 2007 and 2009 International Collegiate Programming Contest which won second place both times.

Career 
After earning his PhD from Tsinghua University in 2012, Lou joined Google as an engineer and in 2015 worked in their autonomous vehicle team.

At the start of 2016, he left Google to work briefly at Quora and then Baidu.

In December 2016, he left Baidu along with Baidu colleague, James Peng (Chief Architect for Autonomous Driving), to found autonomous driving startup Pony.ai. As of 2018, Lou is the chief technology officer of the firm.

Achievements 
 International Olympiad in Informatics: Gold medal (third place overall in 2004)
 International Collegiate Programming Contest World Finals: 2 Gold medals (second place in 2007 and 2009)
 Google Code Jam: Champion (2008 and 2009)
 Facebook Hacker Cup: Second place (2022), Third place (2011 and 2012)
 TopCoder Open Algorithm: Second place (2010)
 TopCoder Open Marathon: Champion (2015), Second place (2013)
Codeforces: Legendary Grandmaster (peak rating 3047)

A more comprehensive list of achievements can be found at the Competitive Programming Hall Of Fame website.

Publications

See also 

 Pony.ai
International Olympiad in Informatics
 Gennady Korotkevich
 Petr Mitrichev
 Makoto Soejima

References

External links 
Online coding profiles
 Topcoder: ACRush
 Codeforces: ACRush
 CodeChef: Tiancheng Lou

Living people
1986 births
Tsinghua University alumni
20th-century Chinese people
Competitive programmers
Chinese computer programmers